Itay Manzor (born 2 July 1994) is an Israeli footballer who play in Maccabi Tzur Shalom.

He made his debut for the senior side in a league game against F.C. Ashdod on 20 April 2013.

References

External links
 

1994 births
Living people
Israeli Jews
Israeli footballers
Maccabi Petah Tikva F.C. players
Maccabi Netanya F.C. players
Maccabi Herzliya F.C. players
Hapoel Beit She'an F.C. players
Maccabi Ironi Kiryat Ata F.C. players
F.C. Dimona players
Shimshon Kafr Qasim F.C. players
Maccabi Tzur Shalom F.C. players
Liga Leumit players
Israeli Premier League players
Footballers from Central District (Israel)
Association football forwards